1972 saw the release of the first commercially successful video arcade game, Pong, and the first video game console, the Magnavox Odyssey.

Events
Pong was the first commercially successful video arcade game. It was first displayed in a prototype cabinet in a bar, Andy Capp's Tavern.
Following the poor sales of Computer Space, Nolan Bushnell leaves Nutting Associates to move his coin-op engineering and design firm with Ted Dabney in to a full-fledged company. When officially incorporating, Bushnell discovers that a roofing company had already been using their name (Syzygy). In its place, the new corporation is named "Atari".
May 24 – Magnavox unveils the Magnavox Odyssey, the first video game console, at a Burlingame, California convention. Nutting Associates, manufacturer of Computer Space, sends Nolan Bushnell to observe the launch. Bushnell reports back that he found the device underwhelming, and expresses no concern over the competition.

Best-selling arcade video games
The following titles were the best-selling arcade video games of 1972 in the United States, according to annual arcade cabinet sales figures provided by Ralph H. Baer.

Notable releases

Video game consoles 
 September – Magnavox begins to sell the Magnavox Odyssey through its own retail stores.
 November 29 – Atari releases its first arcade game, Allan Alcorn's Pong.

Games 
 Gregory Yob programs Hunt the Wumpus, an early progenitor of the interactive fiction genre, in BASIC for mainframe computers.
 Don Daglow programs Star Trek on a PDP-10 mainframe computer at Pomona College. Note that this is a different game from the Star Trek game of 1971

 Civilization (not related to the Sid Meier Civilization games) written on the HP2000 minicomputer at Evergreen State College. A rewrite of this game would come be to known as Empire Classic.

See also 
 1972 in games

References 

Video games by year
Video games